Edwin Barbosa (ca. 1969 – February 5, 2020), also known Edwin de Olinda was a Brazilian percussionist for Alceu Valença.

Career
Barbosa was known for exploring nagô, maracatu, caboclinho along other percussion rhythms. He entered Valença's band in 1988, where he remained for 26 years. Valença made a tribute song to Barbosa while he was alive, titled Quando Edwin desde a ladeira. He also was present at solo works along with partners Stanley Jordan and at Perc Pan festival, playing with Naná Vasconcelos, Gilberto Gil and Carlinhos Brown. In 2013, he was given the Troféu Luiz Gonzaga, granted by the Câmara Municipal de Olinda, for "his relevant role in the enlargement of the Northeast music and culture". He also ran for state deputy for Pernambuco in 2010.

Death
Barbosa suffered from a severe form of diabetes and was being treated for a hospital bacteria and other illnesses. He performed hemodialysis daily at the Hospital Miguel Couto, in Rio de Janeiro and died there, aged 51. His body was flown to Recife on February 8, 2020. The Câmara Municipal de Olinda decreed three days of mourning as a tribute to the percussionist. His body was first shown in the town hall of Olinda, then driven to the Cemitério do Guadalupe and was buried there.

Lawsuit with Alceu Valença
His son, Edwin Santos, published on Instagram that Barbosa died without his rights of retirement, because he was not recognized for his role in Valença band. Since 2014 there was a legal lawsuit about the matter.

References

1969 births
2020 deaths
Brazilian musicians
Brazilian drummers